Kisan Aur Bhagwan is a 1974 Bollywood action comedy-drama film. The film was produced by Dara Singh and directed by Chandrakant, starring Dara Singh, Feroz Khan, Yogeeta Bali and Abhi Bhattacharya among others.

Plot
Ghasitaram, under pressure from his wife, decides to allocate a barren piece of land to his orphaned nephew, Dhanna, who lives with his wife, Bhagwanti, and sister, Laali. Dhanna strives in vain to till this piece of land and ultimately decides to call in Bhagwan Shri Vishnu for assistance. He goes to Pandit Tirlochan, who, instead gives him a rock, and the naive Dhanna brings it home, and refuses to eat anything until and unless Vishnuji shares his humble offerings. This leads to the entire community, including Bhagwanti and Laali, coming to the conclusion that Dhanna has lost his mind.

Cast
Dara Singh as Dhanna
Feroz Khan as Shyamu
Yogeeta Bali as Laali  
Abhi Bhattacharya as Lord Vishnu  
Jayshree Gadkar as Goddess Lakshmi  
Jankidas as Ghasitaram  
Padma Khanna as Goddess Parvathi  
Asit Sen
Nand Kumar
Lalita Kumari as Ghasitaram's Wife
Saudagar Singh

Soundtrack 
Soundtrack was composed by Prem Dhawan and lyrics were penned by Kavi Pradeep

References

External links
 

1974 films
1970s Hindi-language films
1974 drama films
Films scored by Prem Dhawan